Rumi cheese  (also known as   in  Alexandria) is one of the main types of cheese in Egypt. It has a pungent smell, and different degrees of saltiness depending on the age.

Description

Rumi is thought to be derived from the Greek kefalotyri cheese.  It is the main hard cheese in Egypt. It belongs to the same family as Pecorino Romano and Manchego. Rumi cheese is made from cows' milk, or from a mixture of cow and buffalo milk. No starter culture is used. The milk is natural, with full cream.  Peppercorns may be added. After 3–4 months the cheese develops an open texture and a sharp, pungent flavor. Rumi is available in  disks or as slices with variable weight in vacuum packing. There are 100 calories in an ounce serving, with about 28% saturated fat.

Related products

The addition of low levels of PGE or lipases from R. miehei or R. pusillus has been reported to improve the flavor of Ras and Domiati cheeses. 
In 1985 an experimental Ras cheese was made using equal amounts of cow and buffalo milk, with the addition or 20% to 30% of soy milk. The fat content was lower than natural cheese, and the flavor was affected slightly, but the result was said to have "satisfactory sensory properties." Although the fermented cheese mish is traditionally made from Areesh cheese, commercial products similar to mish may be made from ras and domiati cheeses.

See also
 Egyptian cuisine
 Areesh cheese
 Domiati
 List of cheeses

Notes

References

 

Egyptian cheeses